S. P. Miskowski is an American horror writer and playwright.

Biography

S. P. Miskowski was born in Decatur, Georgia. She later moved to the west coast of the US, including Washington and California though she now lives in Canada. She attended the University of Washington where she completed an MFA. She also was awarded two National Endowment for the Arts Fellowships and her works have been nominated for three Shirley Jackson Awards and a Bram Stoker Award. Her second novel was named This Is Horror 2017 Novel of the Year and won the 2017 Charles Dexter Award.

In University Miskowski edited a small press. After college she spent about fifteen years writing plays and working as a teacher and editor. Her plays were produced in Seattle but in 2010 she began to write short stories. These have been published by Supernatural Tales, Horror Bound Magazine, Identity Theory, New Times and Fine Madness.

Bibliography

Skillute Cycle 
 Knock Knock (2011)
 Delphine Dodd (2012)
 Astoria (2013)
 In the Light (2014)
 The Worst Is Yet to Come (2019)
 The Best of Both Worlds (2020)

Novels 
 Knock Knock (2011)
 I Wish I Was Like You (2017)
 The Worst Is Yet to Come (2019)

Collections 
 Red Poppies: 7 Tales of Envy & Revenge (2009)
 Strange Is the Night (2017)

As editor 
 Little Visible Delight (2013) with Kate Jonez

Short fiction 
 Fur (1988)
 A.G.A. (2012)
 This Many (2013)
 Strange Is the Night (2015)
 The Second Floor (2015)
 Death and Disbursement (2015)
 Lost and Found (2016)
 Stag in Flight (2016)
 Water Main (2016)
 Muscadines (2016)
 Somnambule (2016)
 Patio Wing Monsters (2017)
 Vigilance. Sacrifice. (2017)
 140 x 76 (A Tour of Griffith Park) (2017)
 Alligator Point (2017)
 Asking Price (2017)
 We're Never Inviting Amber Again (2017)
 A Condition for Marriage (2017)
 Animal House (2017)
 Ms. X Regrets Everything (2017)
 Pins (2017)
 Legends of Claudia (2018)

References and sources

Year of birth missing (living people)
University of Washington alumni
21st-century American women writers
American women dramatists and playwrights
Writers from Georgia (U.S. state)
American women short story writers
American editors
Living people
21st-century American dramatists and playwrights
21st-century American short story writers